Rogue 417 is a 1984 role-playing game supplement for Fringeworthy published by Tri Tac Games.

Contents
Rogue 417 is the first expansion module for the Fringeworthy interdimensional RPG, and details a post-holocaust alternate earth that has been devastated by the accidental release of a highly virulent plague virus in a lab accident in Syria.

Reception
William A. Barton reviewed Rogue 417 in Space Gamer No. 70. Barton commented that "Overall, Rogue 417 is an excellent first expansion module for Fringeworthy and should prove useful to gamers of any after-the-holocaust RPG currently on the market.  I recommend it highly."

Reviews
Game News #10 (Dec., 1985)

References

Role-playing game supplements introduced in 1984
Science fiction role-playing game supplements